This is a list of some of the military and civilian aircraft produced in Sweden.

Civilian aircraft

Military aircraft

See also 
 List of military aircraft of Sweden

Aircraft manufactured in Sweden